The American Venous Forum (AVF) is the major national academic society focused on venous and lymphatic disease in the United States. Its mission includes education, research, and advocacy. The AVF is the sponsor organization for the Journal of Vascular Surgery Venous and Lymphatic and for the American Venous Forum meeting.



History 
Founded in 1987, the American Venous Forum (AVF) is dedicated to improving the care of patients with venous and lymphatic disease. The AVF fosters cutting edge research and clinical innovation and educates health care professionals, patients and policy makers about venous and lymphatic diseases.

Goals

AVF Vision 
The vision of the AVF society is to promote venous and lymphatic health.

AVF Mission 
The mission of the AVF society since its inception has been to advance science, education and advocacy in venous and lymphatic disease.

Initiatives

Residents, Fellows and Early Career Education Series 
This venous education series provides training and education within the specialties of vascular surgery, interventional radiology, interventional cardiology, vascular medicine, general surgery, and associated programs. These sessions are led by distinguished faculty and leaders in their respective fields and videos of past series can be found on the AVF website for future reference.

COVID-19 resources 
In light of the ongoing pandemic and COVID-19's immense impact on vascular functioning, the AVF has published a list of resources for further study and understanding of the vascular impacts of COVID-19. This list includes links to some of the most recent papers published on the topic as well as the guidelines suggested by other public health organizations.

Venous Guidelines 
AVF has produced committees to critically analyze and revise, when necessary, various venous guidelines in the vascular society community. Some notable ones are listed below:

1. CEAP Classification System and Reporting Standards

2. Clinical Practice Guidelines on Lower Extremity Compression Therapy

3. Appropriate Use Criteria (AUC) for Chronic Lower Extremity Venous Disease

4. Clinical Practice Guidelines on Management of Venous Leg Ulcers

Layman's Handbook for Venous Disorders 
The Layman's Handbook for Venous Disorders is designed to assist vascular care providers with terms, treatment options, and answers to frequently asked questions about venous diseases. This textbook provides essential information on the cause, presentation and up-to-date management of venous diseases. It also includes important data on prevention and treatment of blood clots, leg swelling, varicose veins and venous ulcers.

Vein Specialist Newsletter 
AVF also provides a monthly newsletter via email that discusses upcoming or recent events the society has hosted or been involved with as well as noteworthy journal articles in the vascular field.

Index of Articles of Excellence 
The AVF also maintains an Index of Articles of Excellence that include notable and formative journal articles in the field of vascular surgery. These are good resources for foundational questions and to serve as a starting point for looking more in-depth in crucial issues.

Annual Meeting 
VENOUS2023, the AVF Annual Meeting, is an international, scientific, academic and practical meeting for vascular surgeons as well as other practitioners that treat venous and lymphatic disease around the world. It includes oral and poster presentations on research conducted in vascular surgery in the United States and around the world, as well as demonstrations from medical device companies and a keynote address from the president of the society. This 35th annual meeting will be held on February 22-25, 2023 in San Antonio, Texas. Click the arrow to be taken to the AVF website to learn more about VENOUS2023.

Journal of Vascular Surgery Venous and Lymphatic 
The AVF and Society of Vascular Surgery sponsor the Journal of Vascular Surgery Venous and Lymphatic is a peer reviewed academic journal published by Elsevier that started in 2014.  It has published several of the most notable academic papers in the field of venous and lymphatic disease. In 2019, the journal had an impact factor of 3.137, the highest among venous journals.

References

 
Scientific organizations